"Ca' the yowes to the knowes" ("Drive the ewes to the hills") is a Scottish folk song collected by Robert Burns from 1794. Although sometimes attributed to Burns himself, the seven-stanza original poem is thought to be the work of Ayrshire poet Isabel Pagan, a contemporary of Burns. The poem was partially revised by Burns, and he added an eighth stanza. Burns later re-wrote the poem on a solitary stroll in the country, and this second version consists of six stanzas. It is possible that Burns was not aware that Pagan was the original author, only noting that "this song is in the true Scottish taste, yet I do not know that either air or words were ever in print before."

The original text is a pastoral love poem spoken from the point of view of a shepherdess herding her ewes ("yowes"), who has a romantic meeting with a shepherd lad. Burns's revised version is less explicit about the identity of the narrator, but follows a similar theme of love amid the beauty of nature. Both versions include the refrain, "Ca' the yowes to the knowes".

Text

Musical performances

The song was made widely known in recordings by Kathleen Ferrier of an arrangement by Maurice Jacobson, composer, accompanist and chairman of the music publisher Curwen. These included in recitals given by Ferrier and Bruno Walter at the Edinburgh Festival of 1952.

In 1922, the English composer and scholar of folk music Ralph Vaughan Williams wrote a choral setting of "Ca' the yowes" for tenor solo and SATB chorus. Benjamin Britten also wrote an arrangement of the song in 1951 for solo voice and piano. This version was later covered by artists like Shirley Collins and House and Land.

References

External links

Text of Burns's second version: 

Songs with lyrics by Robert Burns
1790s songs